Bayeux Cathedral, also known as Cathedral of Our Lady of Bayeux (French: Cathédrale Notre-Dame de Bayeux), is a Roman Catholic church located in the town of Bayeux in Normandy, France. A national monument, it is the seat of the Bishop of Bayeux and Lisieux and was probably the original home of the Bayeux Tapestry, still preserved nearby. The cathedral is in the Norman-Romanesque architectural tradition.

The site is an ancient one and was once occupied by Roman sanctuaries. The present cathedral was consecrated on 14 July 1077 in the presence of William, Duke of Normandy and King of England. It was on this site that William may have forced Harold Godwinson to take an oath of support to him, the breaking of which led to the Norman conquest of England – meaning that the oath must have been made before 1066.

Architecture
Following serious damage to the cathedral in the 12th century, the cathedral was rebuilt in Gothic style which is most notable in the crossing tower, transepts and east end. However, despite the crossing tower having been started in the 15th century, it was not completed until the 19th century.

Gallery

Bayeux Tapestry

See also
 Roman Catholic Marian churches

External links

Location
 Photos
 Stained Glass Windows
 High-resolution 360° Panoramas and Images of Bayeux Cathedral | Art Atlas

Roman Catholic cathedrals in France
Churches in Calvados (department)
Churches with Norman architecture
Romanesque architecture in Normandy
Monuments historiques of Calvados (department)
Bayeux